is a cultural psychologist and professor of psychology at the University of Alberta. Masuda received his B.A. from Hokkaido University in 1993, M.A from Kyoto university in 1996 under the supervision of Shinobu Kitayama, and later received his Ph.D from the University of Michigan where his adviser was Richard E. Nisbett. In perhaps his most popular study, Masuda displayed a series of images with characters of varied emotional expression. There was a distinct measurable difference in the way North Americans and Japanese perceived the emotion of the central figure of the image, such that for North Americans the perception of the emotion of the central figure was not affected by whether or not the figures in the background showed a congruent emotion. Whereas the Japanese participants were markedly influenced in their judgement of the central figures emotional state depending on the emotional states of the surrounding figure.

Selected publications

 Masuda, T., Li, L. M. W., Russell, M. J. & Lee, H. (2019). Perception and cognition. In S. Kitayama & D. Cohen (Eds.), Handbook of cultural psychology (Second Edition), pp. 222-245. New York: Guilford Press
 Masuda, T. (2017). Culture and attention: Recent empirical findings and new directions in cultural psychology. Social and Personality Psychology Compass, 11(12), e12363. DOI: 10.1111/spc3.12363.
 Imai, M., Kanero, J., & Masuda, T. (2016). The relation between language, culture, and thought: Discussions on the need for an interdisciplinary approach. Current Opinion in Psychology, 8, 70-77.
 Masuda, T., & Yamagishi, T, (2010). Bunka Shinri Gaku, Jyokan & Gekan [Cultural psychology, Vol. 1 & Vol. 2]. Tokyo: Baihukan. (in Japanese).
 Masuda, T., Gonzalez, R. Kwan, L., & Nisbett, R. E. (2008). Culture and aesthetic preference: Comparing the attention to context of East Asians and European Americans. Personality and Social Psychology Bulletin, 34, 1260–1275
 Masuda, T., Ellsworth, P. C., Mesquita, B., Leu, J., Tanida, S., & van de Veerdonk, E. (2008). Placing the face in context: Cultural differences in the perception of facial emotion. Journal of Personality and Social Psychology, 94, 365-38
 Masuda, T. & Nisbett, R. E. (2006). Culture and change blindness. Cognitive Sciences, 30, 381-399.
 Nisbett, R. E., & Masuda, T. (2003). Culture and point of view. Proceedings of the National Academy of Sciences of the United States of America, 100, 11163-11175.
 Masuda, T. & Nisbett, R. E. (2001). Attending holistically vs. analytically: Comparing the context Sensitivity of Japanese and Americans. Journal of Personality and Social Psychology, 81, 922-934.

Awards 
 Book of the Year Award, The Japanese Society of Social Psychology Book of the Year Award (2010)
 Brickman Memorial Award, University of Michigan (2001)
 Japanese Psychological Association Award for International Contributions to Psychology (2010)
 APS Fellow, Association for Psychological Science (2022)

Lab 
Masuda runs an active research lab at the University of Alberta, where he supervises a number of graduate and undergraduate research projects while conducting his own research.

Affiliations
 American Psychological Society
 Cognitive Science Society
 Canadian Psychological Association
 Japanese Psychological Association
 Society of Personality and Social Psychology

References

External links 
 Masuda's Home page
 University of Alberta home page
 Social psychology network

Year of birth missing (living people)
Living people
Japanese psychologists
University of Michigan alumni
Cultural psychologists